Eaglestone may refer to:
Eaglestones or Aetites (Latin) are hollow geode stones, once with a reputation for protection in child birth and other properties
a nickname for the large seeds of the tropical nickernut climbing vine
Clach an Tiompain, Pictish standing stone called the Eagle Stone
Places
Eaglestone, Milton Keynes, England
People
Phil Eaglestone, born 1982, Irish international cricketer
Robin Eaglestone, born 1976, British musician